Richard George Voge (4 May 1904 – 1948), born in Chicago, Illinois, was an officer in the United States Navy.  He completed the course at Harrison Technical High School in Chicago in 1921, and entered the Naval Academy later that year.  He graduated on 4 June 1925 and received his ensign's commission.

His first assignment was three years in the armored cruiser Pittsburgh (CA-4).  In early 1929, Voge returned to the United States from the Far East to attend the Submarine School at New London, Connecticut.  After completing that course and qualifying for submarine duty, he spent the bulk of his remaining time at sea in submarines.

January 1931 through June 1932:  S-29
 
July 1932 to September 1933: war plans and intelligence training at the Great Lakes Naval Training Station.
 
September 1933 through June 1935: Instructor in Marine Engineering at the Naval Academy.
 
June 1935 until May 1937: Command of S-18
  
May 1937 through August 1937:  Command of S-33
 
August 1937 through September 1939:  Naval Ordnance Plant at Baldwin on Long Island
 
September 1939 to late January 1940: A four-month tour of duty as commissioning executive officer of the destroyer Rowan (DD-405)

In mid-February 1940, Commander Voge returned to the Asiatic Fleet and assumed command of the submarine Sealion (SS-195), based at Cavite in the Philippines, and commanded that submarine until the opening day of American participation in World War II.

At the outbreak of hostilities on 8 December 1941 (West Longitude Time), Voge suffered the double ignominy of having his command caught in overhaul and, three days later, of losing her to enemy bombs while still at Cavite Navy Yard.  Voge, however, quickly recovered from that blow, assumed command of Sailfish (SS-192) (formerly named Squalus) on 17 December, and led her on five successful war patrols during the first eight months of 1942.  Until the Battles of Coral Sea and of Midway in May and June, respectively, only Pacific Fleet submarines like Sailfish were able to fight to impede the Japanese onslaught; and their war patrols provided the one bright spot for the Allied cause in the Pacific.

In August 1942, upon the completion of his fifth war patrol in Sailfish, Voge received orders to join the staff of Commander, Submarine Force, Pacific Fleet, as operations and combat intelligence officer.  He retained that position, in which he was promoted to Captain to date from 20 July 1943, until late in the war, when he was ordered to Washington, D.C., to serve in the Office of the Chief of Naval Operations.

On 1 November 1946, Capt. Voge was retired from the navy and advanced to the rank of rear admiral. A little over two years later, Rear Admiral Voge died at the United Hospital at Port Chester, New York.

See also

References

1904 births
1948 deaths
United States Navy officers
United States Navy personnel of World War II